Comet Hartley is the name of:
 100P/Hartley or Hartley 1
 103P/Hartley or Hartley 2
  or Hartley 3

See also 
 Hartley (disambiguation)